Merrill at Midnight is the fourth album by Helen Merrill, featuring the singer fronting a quartet augmented by an orchestra arranged and conducted by Hal Mooney, recorded in 1957 and released on the EmArcy label.

Reception

The AllMusic review by Bruce Eder stated "this one's a keeper and in a class by itself, with lots and lots of class."

Track listing
 "Soft as Spring" (Alec Wilder) - 3:06   
 "Black Is the Color of My True Love's Hair" (Traditional) - 2:27   
 "Lazy Afternoon" (John La Touche, Jerome Moross) - 3:00   
 "The Things We Did Last Summer" (Sammy Cahn, Jule Styne) - 3:02   
 "After You" (Cole Porter) - 3:01   
 "If You Go" (Geoffrey Parsons) - 3:08   
 "If I Forget You" (Irving Caesar) -  3:16   
 "If Love Were All" (Noël Coward) - 3:02   
 "Easy Come Easy Go" (Johnny Green, Edward Heyman) - 3:41   
 "I'll Be Around" (Wilder) - 2:42  
Recorded in New York on February 21, 1957 (tracks 1, 3, 5, 7 & 10) and February 27, 1957 (tracks 2, 4, 6, 8 & 9)

Personnel
Helen Merrill - vocals
Marian McPartland (tracks 2, 4, 6, 8 & 9), Buddy Weed (tracks 1, 3, 5, 7 & 10) - piano
Bill Mure - guitar
Milt Hinton - double bass
Sol Gubin - drums
Unidentified orchestra arranged and conducted by Hal Mooney

References

EmArcy Records albums
Helen Merrill albums
Albums arranged by Hal Mooney
Albums conducted by Hal Mooney
1957 albums
Albums produced by Bob Shad